Rosskogel or Roßkogel may refer to the following mountains:

 Zwieselbacher Rosskogel (3,081 m) and Gleirscher Rosskogel (2,994 m), Stubai Alps
 Roßkogel (Stubai Alps), 2,646 m, near Gries in the Sellrain valley, Stubai Alps
 Rosskogel (Rofan), 1,940 m, near Kramsach, Rofan
 Roßkogel (Mürzsteg Alps, near Mürzzuschlag), 1,479 m, near Mürzzuschlag in the Mürz valley, Mürzsteg Alps
 Roßkogel (Mürzsteg Alps, near St. Marein), 1,374 m, near St. Marein in the Mürz valley, Mürzsteg Alps